Rover.com is an American company which operates an online marketplace for people to buy and sell pet care services including pet sitting, dog boarding, and dog walking. Rover.com was founded in 2011 in Seattle, Washington and is formally incorporated under the name "A Place for Rover, Inc." The company serves as a broker and takes roughly 20% of each transaction booked through its site.

As of September 2016 Rover.com was valued at $300 million.

History 
Founder Greg Gottesman had a hard time finding good pet sitting for his yellow Labrador named Ruby. In June 2011 he went to the Startup Weekend in Seattle, Washington and pitched the idea for what would become Rover.com. At that event Gottesman worked with interested supporters, including co-founder Philip Kimmey, and they later decided to move ahead with starting the company.

Rover.com first began operations in Seattle, Washington, and Portland, Oregon. By 2012 it had expanded to all 50 states.

On March 29, 2017, Rover.com acquired DogVacay in an all-stock deal. At that time, it was reported that total bookings on the combined sites amounted to $150 million in 2016, of which they kept about 20% in commission fees.

On May 2, 2018, Rover.com announced expansion into Europe.

Rover.com has a panel of pet experts, including vets Dr. Gary Richter, Dr.Rebecca Greenstein, Dog expert and trainer Nicole Ellis, and cat expert Mikel Delgado that assist in giving pet advice and guidance.

Lawsuits and controversies  

Rover.com has been sued multiple times for deaths of pets resulting from negligent care provided by sitters. Attention from the press and online groups have focused attention on Rover.com's accountability, particularly in its use of independent contractors. An article written September 14, 2020, on ABC15 Arizona discusses a woman whose dogs went missing during a Rover visit and was missing for 3 months at the time. The sitter who had been watching the dogs was still accepting new clients and easily available on Rover.com while the pet owner was searching for her dogs. Rover.com only referred to themselves as an advertising company for independent contractors. Rover.com's current Q&A Community page has a question posted by a woman whose dog in the care of Rover.com sitter escaped the yard where the dog was left unattended, and was later hit by a car and killed. The Rover.com user asked for some sort of reimbursement and the sitter to be removed. Rover.com's comment back to her was to ask the user to reach out to Rover.com's team to review the case. An article from 11ALIVE.com discusses a woman whose dog also escaped during a Rover.com boarding experience and was hit and killed by car. She has since started a petition asking for Rover.com to review their criteria for sitters and the safety of the pets. The petition, started after her dog died June 4, 2021, is currently above 15,175 signatures.

Financing 

Rover.com's first round of investment funding was secured in April 2012, led by Madrona Venture Group.  Additional capital was secured in February 2013, from The Foundry Group. In July 2013, Petco announced an investment in Rover and a business partnership for cross-promotion with Petco's stores and website.

In March 2014, it was announced that Rover.com had raised an additional $12 million in funding led by Menlo Ventures, with Madrona Venture Group, The Foundry Group, and Petco.  One year later, in March 2015, it was announced that Rover.com raised a $25 million funding round led by Technology Crossover Ventures.

Rover.com received $40 million in investments in October 2016 and another $65 million in July 2017, led by Spark Capital.

In May 2018, Rover.com raised another $155 million funding.

They are currently a publicly traded company listed on the NASDAQ exchange under the ticker: ROVR

Services 

In 2011, Rover.com began by creating a marketplace for dog sitting and boarding services. Over the next four years it expanded its offerings to include dog walking, doggy daycare, and drop-in visits. Every sitter on the platform is an independent contractor and is not an employee of Rover.com. In 2017 Rover.com began its Quick Match dog walking service, enabling owners to instantly book a dog walker. The service is no longer available

Rover.com takes a percentage of each booking made on its site.

References

External links 

Companies based in Seattle
American companies established in 2011
Retail companies established in 2011
Internet properties established in 2011
Online retailers of the United States
Pet stores
Dog-related professions and professionals